Mikhail Mikhailovich Zemskov (born 2 May 1994) is a Russian professional football player. He plays for FC Avangard Kursk.

Club career
He made his Russian Football National League debut for FC Torpedo Vladimir on 17 October 2011 in a game against FC Chernomorets Novorossiysk.

Honors
FNL Cup: 2019
Individual
FNL Cup Best Midfielder:2019

References

External links
 

1994 births
Footballers from Yaroslavl
Living people
Russian footballers
Association football midfielders
Association football forwards
Russia under-21 international footballers
FC Shinnik Yaroslavl players
FC Avangard Kursk players
FC Neftekhimik Nizhnekamsk players
FC Fakel Voronezh players
FC Sokol Saratov players
FC Torpedo Vladimir players
Russian First League players
Russian Second League players